Pietro Campori (c.1553 – 4 February 1643) was an Italian cardinal of the Catholic Church and Bishop of Cremona. He was friends with Scipione Borghese, the nephew of Pope Paul V, and was twice a candidate for election to the papacy, in the conclaves of 1621 and 1623.

Early career
Campori studied canon law in Lucca and Pisa, and moved to Rome after he was ordained a priest. In Rome, he worked with Cesare Speciano and went with him to Spain when Speciano was appointed the papal nuncio there in 1585 and served there as his priest secretary. He stayed in Spain with Speciano and was eventually granted a pension by Philip II of Spain. In 1596 he was made a noble by Rudolf II, Holy Roman Emperor.

Upon returning to Italy, Campori assisted Speciano in the latter's new role as the Bishop of Cremona. He took part in the synods of that diocese in 1599 and 1604, and was named a canon of its cathedral in 1600. Upon Speciano's death in 1607, Campori returned to Rome.

In Rome, Campori served as the private secretary and major domo for Paul V's nephew Scipione Borghese. Additionally from 1609 to 1617 he served as the general preceptor for the Order of the Holy Ghost, a religious order that provided healthcare. Pope Paul V created Campori Cardinal Priest of San Tommaso in Parione in 1616.

Cardinalate

Borghese had promoted Campori as a candidate for pope in both the 1621 papal conclave following Paul V's death and the 1623 papal conclave. In 1621, Campori received support from the cardinals created by Paul V and was an acceptable choice to the Habsburgs. He was opposed by the cardinals from Venice, who had been ordered to vote against him, and the French ambassador attempted to undermine his election. Additionally, Pietro Aldobrandini, the nephew of Pope Clement VIII, opposed the election of any creation of Paul V, and was carried into the conclave on a litter despite being sick. Borghese wanted to have Campori elected by acclamation on the first night of the conclave, but the ambassador of Louis XIII of France had a letter excluding Campori from election to the papacy, and waited for cardinals opposed to Campori to arrive before leaving a vote so as to not have to formally exclude him. When the initial scrutiny did not elect Campori, Borghese did not attempt to promote him further, hoping that he would eventually be elected if the conclave deadlocked.

Campori was not elected pope, but instead Alessandro Ludovisi was elected, taking the name Pope Gregory XV. After his election over Campori, Gregory named the latter Bishop of Cremona on 17 May 1621.

In 1623, Campori was also Borghese's favoured candidate, but it became clear after the first scrutiny that another member of the party loyal to Borghese had the best chance of being elected, and Borghese shifted his support.

Notes

References

External links
Profile on Catholic-Hierarchy 

17th-century Italian cardinals
1553 births
1643 deaths
Bishops of Cremona
17th-century Italian Roman Catholic bishops